The Percy A. Smith House is a historic house located in the unincorporated Dunthorpe neighborhood of Multnomah County, Oregon, just south of the Portland municipal boundary.  It is listed on the National Register of Historic Places.

See also
 National Register of Historic Places listings in Multnomah County, Oregon

References

External links

1922 establishments in Oregon
Houses completed in 1922
Houses in Multnomah County, Oregon
Houses on the National Register of Historic Places in Oregon
National Register of Historic Places in Multnomah County, Oregon
Portland Historic Landmarks